Michael L. Aresco is an American college sports and television executive. Aresco is the current commissioner of the American Athletic Conference (AAC/The American), a college athletics conference. He was the last commissioner of the old Big East Conference from August 14, 2012 to June 30, 2013.  He continued as commissioner of The American, the legal successor to the old Big East, when that league formally began operations on July 1, 2013.

Aresco is a graduate of Tufts University, the Fletcher School of Law and Diplomacy at Tufts University and the University of Connecticut Law School .  He practiced law privately in Hartford, Conn., for several years. He previously served as the Executive Vice President, Programming of CBS Sports.  and started in TV  with ESPN where he was responsible for overseeing the acquisition, scheduling and development of long-term strategies for all ESPN college sports properties. He joined ESPN in 1984 as Counsel and was named Assistant General Counsel in 1988 before moving to the programming department.

References

External links
 American Athletic Conference Bio

Living people
American Athletic Conference commissioners
Big East Conference commissioners
Year of birth missing (living people)
Place of birth missing (living people)